Essex County, Ontario County Council Elections were held on October 25, 2010 in conjunction with municipal elections across the province.

Essex County Council
Essex County Council consists of the 7 mainland mayors of Essex County and their seven deputy mayors. Pelee Island is considered a "separate township," and is not represented on County council but is included on this list.

Amherstburg

Essex

Kingsville

Lakeshore

LaSalle

Leamington

Tecumseh

Pelee (separated township)

2010 Ontario municipal elections
Essex County, Ontario